Sonda Parish was an Estonian municipality located in Ida-Viru County. It had a population of 1,019 (2006) and an area of 161 km².

Settlements
Small boroughs
Erra - Sonda

Villages
Erra-Liiva - Ilmaste - Koljala - Nüri - Satsu - Uljaste - Vainu - Vana-Sonda - Varinurme

References

External links 
 

Former municipalities of Estonia